Françoise Tshibola Kashala (born 28 December 1994) is a Congolese handball player for HC Heritage and the DR Congo national team.

She represented DR Congo at the 2019 World Women's Handball Championship.

References

1994 births
Living people
Democratic Republic of the Congo female handball players
21st-century Democratic Republic of the Congo people